The 2015–16 Utah Jazz season was the 42nd season of the franchise in the National Basketball Association (NBA), and the 37th season of the franchise in Salt Lake City. Utah missed the playoffs for the fourth year in a row thanks to a win and a tiebreaker win by the Houston Rockets, but remained in playoff contention until before the final regular season game in which would be Kobe Bryant's last NBA game.

Draft picks

Roster

Conference

Game log

Preseason

|- style="background:#bfb;"
| 1 || October 4 || @ L.A. Lakers
| 90–71
| Derrick Favors (16)
| Favors, Hayward (9)
| Raul Neto (6)
| Stan Sheriff Center10,300
| 1–0
|- style="background:#bfb;"
| 2 || October 6 || @ L.A. Lakers
| 117–114 OT
| Alec Burks (27)
| Trey Lyles (8)
| Alec Burks (6)
| Stan Sheriff Center10,300
| 2–0
|- style="background:#fcc;"
| 3 || October 9 || @ Phoenix
| 85–101
| Gordon Hayward (24)
| Favors, Booker (7)
| Gordon Hayward (3)
| Talking Stick Resort Arena10,773
| 2–1
|- style="background:#fcc;"
| 4 || October 12 || @ Portland
| 81–88
| Alec Burks (19)
| Derrick Favors (10)
| Alec Burks (3)
| Moda Center15,171
| 2–2
|- style="background:#fcc;"
| 5 || October 18 || Portland
| 111–116 OT
| Trey Burke (22)
| Jeff Withey (11)
| Burke, Booker, Lyles, Neto (3)
| EnergySolutions Arena16,352
| 2–3
|- style="background:#fcc;"
| 6 || October 20 || Oklahoma City
| 102–113
| Rodney Hood (23)
| Trevor Booker (6)
| Trey Burke (4)
| EnergySolutions Arena17,806
| 2–4
|- style="background:#bfb;"
| 7 || October 22 || Denver
| 98–78
| Trey Burke (17)
| Rudy Gobert (11)
| Alec Burks (5)
| EnergySolutions Arena17,083
| 3–4

Regular season game log

|- style="background:#fbb;"
| 1
| October 28
| @ Detroit
| 
| Derrick Favors (26)
| Rudy Gobert (12)
| Rodney Hood (6)
| Palace of Auburn Hills18,434
| 0–1
|-style="background:#bfb;"
| 2
| October 30
| @ Philadelphia
| 
| Derrick Favors (20)
| Derrick Favors (12)
| Trey Burke (6)
| Wells Fargo Center17,122
| 1–1
|-style="background:#bfb;"
| 3
| October 31
| @ Indiana
| 
| Derrick Favors (18)
| Rudy Gobert (17)
| Hayward, Burke (3)
| Bankers Life Fieldhouse14,412
| 2–1

|-style="background:#fbb;"
| 4
| November 4
| Portland
| 
| Alec Burks (21)
| Derrick Favors (10)
| Rodney Hood (4)
| Vivint Smart Home Arena19,911
| 2–2
|- style="background:#bfb;"
| 5
| November 5
| @ Denver
| 
| Gordon Hayward (20)
| Rudy Gobert (16)
| Alec Burks (8)
| Pepsi Center9,906
| 3–2
|- style="background:#bfb;"
| 6
| November 7
| Memphis
| 
| Trey Burke (24)
| Derrick Favors (16)
| Burks, Hayward (4)
| Vivint Smart Home Arena19,456
| 4–2
|- style="background:#fbb;"
| 7
| November 10
| @ Cleveland
| 
| Alec Burks (24)
| Derrick Favors (9)
| Gobert, Neto (5)
| Quicken Loans Arena20,562
| 4–3
|- style="background:#fbb;"
| 8
| November 12
| @ Miami
| 
| Derrick Favors (25)
| Derrick Favors (12)
| Hayward, Hood (3)
| American Airlines Arena19,600
| 4–4
|- style="background:#fbb;"
| 9
| November 13
| @ Orlando
| 
| Burke, Hayward (16)
| Booker, Favors, Withey (7)
| Raul Neto (7)
| Amway Center16,709
| 4–5
|- style="background:#bfb;"
| 10
| November 15
| @ Atlanta
| 
| Derrick Favors (23)
| Rudy Gobert (11)
| Trey Burke (5)
| Philips Arena14,436
| 5–5
|- style="background:#bfb;"
| 11
| November 18
| Toronto
| 
| Derrick Favors (18)
| Derrick Favors (11)
| Rodney Hood (4)
| Vivint Smart Home Arena18,741
| 6–5
|- style="background:#fbb;"
| 12
| November 20
| @ Dallas
| 
| Gordon Hayward (22)
| Rudy Gobert (13)
| Hayward, Hood (4)
| AmericanAirlines Arena20,028
| 6–6
|- style="background:#fbb;"
| 13
| November 23
| Oklahoma City
| 
| Gordon Hayward (19)
| Derrick Favors (7)
| Gordon Hayward (4)
| Vivint Smart Home Arena19,911
| 6–7
|- style="background:#bfb;"
| 14
| November 25
| @ L.A. Clippers
| 
| Gordon Hayward (33)
| Rudy Gobert (11)
| Raul Neto (6)
| Staples Center19,060
| 7–7
|- style="background:#bfb;"
| 15
| November 28
| New Orleans
| 
| Alec Burks (21)
| Trevor Booker (15)
| Burks, Hood (4)
| Vivint Smart Home Arena19,911
| 8–7
|- style="background:#fbb;"
| 16
| November 30
| Golden State
| 
| Derrick Favors (23)
| Rudy Gobert (11)
| Gordon Hayward (4)
| Vivint Smart Home Arena19,911
| 8–8

|- style="background:#fbb;"
| 17
| December 3
| Orlando
| 
| Gordon Hayward (24)
| Derrick Favors (10)
| Trey Burke (6)
| Vivint Smart Home Arena19,247
| 8–9
|- style="background:#bfb;"
| 18
| December 5
| Indiana
| 
| Derrick Favors (35)
| Trevor Booker (14)
| Trey Burke (7)
| Vivint Smart Home Arena19,500
| 9–9
|- style="background:#fbb;"
| 19
| December 8
| @ Sacramento
| 
| Burks, Hayward (18)
| Booker, Favors (10)
| Gordon Hayward (6)
| Sleep Train Arena16,505
| 9–10
|- style="background:#bfb;"
| 20
| December 9
| New York
| 
| Gordon Hayward (24)
| Trey Lyles (10)
| Hayward, Neto, Burke (5)
| Vivint Smart Home Arena18,586
| 10–10
|- style="background:#fbb;"
| 21
| December 11
| Oklahoma City
| 
| Gordon Hayward (19)
| Gordon Hayward (8)
| Alec Burks (5)
| Vivint Smart Home Arena19,911
| 10–11
|- style="background:#fbb;"
| 22
| December 13
| @ Oklahoma City
| 
| Rodney Hood (23)
| Derrick Favors (10)
| Elijah Millsap (4)
| Chesapeake Energy Arena18,203
| 10–12
|- style="background:#fbb;"
| 23
| December 14
| @ San Antonio
| 
| Derrick Favors (16)
| Trevor Booker (7)
| Joe Ingles (4)
| AT&T Center18,418
| 10–13
|- style="background:#fbb;"
| 24
| December 16
| New Orleans
| 
| Derrick Favors (22)
| Derrick Favors (7)
| Burke, Favors (5)
| Vivint Smart Home Arena17,899
| 10–14
|- style="background:#bfb;"
| 25
| December 18
| Denver
| 
| Gordon Hayward (26)
| Derrick Favors (9)
| Rodney Hood (5)
| Vivint Smart Home Arena19,169
| 11–14
|- style="background:#bfb;"
| 26
| December 21
| Phoenix
| 
| Gordon Hayward (24)
| Derrick Favors (9)
| Gordon Hayward (4)
| Vivint Smart Home Arena19,911
| 12–14
|- style="background:#fbb;"
| 27
| December 23
| @ Golden State
| 
| Derrick Favors (17)
| Derrick Favors (9)
| Burke, Hood, Ingles (3)
| Oracle Arena19,596
| 12–15
|- style="background:#fbb;"
| 28
| December 26
| L.A. Clippers
| 
| Gordon Hayward (28)
| Jeff Withey (7)
| Gordon Hayward (5)
| Vivint Smart Home Arena19,911
| 12–16
|- style="background:#bfb;"
| 29
| December 28
| Philadelphia
| 
| Gordon Hayward (24)
| Jeff Withey (12)
| Gordon Hayward (4)
| Vivint Smart Home Arena19,911
| 13–16
|- style="background:#fbb;"
| 30
| December 30
| @ Minnesota
| 
| Trey Burke (23)
| Trevor Booker (15)
| Trey Burke (4)
| Target Center14,326
| 13–17
|- style="background:#bfb;"
| 31
| December 31
| Portland
| 
| Gordon Hayward (23)
| Gordon Hayward (10)
| Rodney Hood (6)
| Vivint Smart Home Arena19,380
| 14–17

|- style="background:#bfb;"
| 32
| January 2
| Memphis
| 
| Rodney Hood (32)
| Trevor Booker (11)
| Gordon Hayward (4)
| Vivint Smart Home Arena18,455
| 15–17
|- style="background:#fbb;"
| 33
| January 4
| Houston
| 
| Rodney Hood (23)
| Jeff Withey (11)
| Rodney Hood (7)
| Vivint Smart Home Arena17,912
| 15–18
|- style="background:#fbb;"
| 34
| January 6
| @ San Antonio
| 
| Trey Burke (21)
| Booker, Withey (7)
| Burke, Hayward (4)
| AT&T Center18,418
| 15–19
|- style="background:#fbb;"
| 35
| January 7
| @ Houston
| 
| Gordon Hayward (15)
| Trey Lyles (9)
| Raul Neto (7)
| Toyota Center18,155
| 15–20
|- style="background:#bfb;"
| 36
| January 9
| Miami
| 
| Gordon Hayward (34)
| Trey Lyles (10)
| Raul Neto (5)
| Vivint Smart Home Arena19,911
| 16–20
|- style="background:#bfb;"
| 37
| January 10
| @ L. A. Lakers
| 
| Gordon Hayward (25)
| Trey Lyles (9)
| Rodney Hood (4)
| Staples Center18,997
| 17–20
|- style="background:#fbb;"
| 38
| January 13
| @ Portland
| 
| Gordon Hayward (19)
| Rudy Gobert (8)
| Gordon Hayward (9)
| Moda Center19,393
| 17–21
|- style="background:#fbb;"
| 39
| January 14
| Sacramento
| 
| Hayward, Lyles (19)
| Rudy Gobert (12)
| Raul Neto (4)
| Vivint Smart Home Arena17,894
| 17–22
|- style="background:#bfb;"
| 40
| January 16
| L. A. Lakers
| 
| Rudy Gobert (18)
| Rudy Gobert (18)
| Gordon Hayward (5)
| Vivint Smart Home Arena19,911
| 18–22
|-style="background:#fbb;"
| 41
| January 18
| @ Charlotte
| 
| Gordon Hayward (36)
| Rudy Gobert (14)
| Gordon Hayward (9)
| Time Warner Cable Arena17,459
| 18–23
|-style="background:#fbb;"
| 42
| January 20
| @ New York
| 
| Rodney Hood (29)
| Booker, Gobert (8)
| Hayward, Hood (5)
| Madison Square Garden19,812
| 18–24
|- style="background:#bfb;"
| 43
| January 22
| @ Brooklyn
| 
| Gordon Hayward (21)
| Rudy Gobert (9)
| Gordon Hayward (9)
| Barclays Center12,809
| 19–24
|- style="background:#fbb;"
| 44
| January 25
| Detroit
| 
| Rodney Hood (23)
| Rudy Gobert (17)
| Rodney Hood (6)
| Vivint Smart Home Arena18,783
| 19–25
|- style="background:#bfb;"
| 45
| January 27
| Charlotte
| 
| Rodney Hood (24)
| Rudy Gobert (12)
| Gordon Hayward (5)
| Vivint Smart Home Arena16,683
| 20–25
|- style="background:#bfb;"
| 46
| January 29
| Minnesota
| 
| Rodney Hood (22)
| Rudy Gobert (12)
| Raul Neto (6)
| Vivint Smart Home Arena18,850
| 21–25

|- style="background:#bfb;"
| 47
| February 1
| Chicago
| 
| Gordon Hayward (27)
| Gobert, Hayward (12)
| Gordon Hayward (7)
| Vivint Smart Home Arena18,811
| 22–25
|- style="background:#bfb;"
| 48
| February 3
| Denver
| 
| Favors, Hayward (16)
| Derrick Favors (11)
| Gordon Hayward (5)
| Vivint Smart Home Arena19,461
| 23–25
|- bgcolor=bbffbb
| 49
| February 5
| Milwaukee
| 
| Rodney Hood (23)
| Derrick Favors (15)
| Raul Neto (4)
| Vivint Smart Home Arena19,911
| 24–25
|- bgcolor=bbffbb
| 50
| February 6
| @ Phoenix
| 
| Rodney Hood (25)
| Rudy Gobert (13)
| Raul Neto (4)
| Talking Stick Resort Arena16,180
| 25–25
|- bgcolor=bbffbb
| 51
| February 9
| @ Dallas
| 
| Rodney Hood (29)
| Rudy Gobert (10)
| Rodney Hood (5)
| AmericanAirlines Arena19,394
| 26–25
|- bgcolor=ffbbbb
| 52
| February 10
| @ New Orleans
| 
| Derrick Favors (29)
| Rudy Gobert (14)
| Gordon Hayward (4)
| Smoothie King Center15,256
| 26–26
|- align="center"
|colspan="9" bgcolor="#bbcaff"|All-Star Break'''
|- bgcolor=ffbbbb
| 53
| February 18
| @ Washington
| 
| Gordon Hayward (19)
| Rudy Gobert (12)
| Trey Burke (7)
| Verizon Center12,415
| 26–27
|- style="background:#bfb;"
| 54
| February 19
| Boston
| 
| Derrick Favors (23)
| Rudy Gobert (15)
| Derrick Favors (6)
| Vivint Smart Home Arena19,911
| 27–27
|- style="background:#fbb;"
| 55
| February 21
| @ Portland
| 
| Derrick Favors (22)
| Favors, Gobert (8)
| Shelvin Mack (6)
| Moda Center19,470
| 27–28
|- style="background:#bfb;"
| 56
| February 23
| Houston
| 
| Gordon Hayward (28)
| Derrick Favors (12)
| Hayward, Hood (5)
| Vivint Smart Home Arena18,132
| 28–28
|- style="background:#fbb;"
| 57
| February 25
| San Antonio
| 
| Derrick Favors (25)
| Favors, Gobert (6)
| Rodney Hood (6)
| Vivint Smart Home Arena19,911
| 28–29
|- style="background:#fbb;"
| 58
| February 27
| Brooklyn
| 
| Gordon Hayward (27)
| Rudy Gobert (19)
| Gordon Hayward (6)
| Vivint Smart Home Arena18,863
| 28–30
|- style="background:#fbb;"
| 59
| February 29
| @ Boston
| 
| Lyles, Mack (18)
| Derrick Favors (16)
| Shelvin Mack (5)
| TD Garden17,680
| 28–31

|- style="background:#fbb;"
| 60
| March 2
| @ Toronto
| 
| Gordon Hayward (26)
| Rudy Gobert (8)
| Gordon Hayward (6)
| Air Canada Centre19,800
| 28–32
|- style="background:#fbb;"
| 61
| March 4
| @ Memphis
| 
| Gordon Hayward (18)
| Rudy Gobert (18)
| Shelvin Mack (8)
| FedExForum17,188
| 28–33
|- style="background:#bfb;"
| 62
| March 5
| @ New Orleans
| 
| Derrick Favors (28)
| Rudy Gobert (18)
| Hayward, Ingles, Mack (4)
| Smoothie King Center16,680
| 29–33
|- style="background:#fbb;"
| 63
| March 8
| Atlanta
| 
| Gordon Hayward (22)
| Rudy Gobert (15)
| Shelvin Mack (4)
| Vivint Smart Home Arena19,282
| 29–34
|- style="background:#fbb;"
| 64
| March 9
| @ Golden State
| 
| Trey Burke (18)
| Rudy Gobert (15)
| Shelvin Mack (8)
| Oracle Arena19,596
| 29–35
|- style="background:#bfb;"
| 65
| March 11
| Washington
| 
| Shelvin Mack (27)
| Rudy Gobert (11)
| Shelvin Mack (4)
| Vivint Smart Home Arena19,911
| 30–35
|-style="background:#bfb;"
| 66
| March 13
| @ Sacramento
| 
| Derrick Favors (28)
| Derrick Favors (14)
| Shelvin Mack (8)
| Sleep Train Arena17,023
| 31–35
|- style="background:#bfb;"
| 67
| March 14
| Cleveland
| 
| Rodney Hood (28)
| Rudy Gobert (11)
| Shelvin Mack (10)
| Vivint Smart Home Arena19,911
| 32–35
|- style="background:#bfb;"
| 68
| March 17
| Phoenix
| 
| Trey Lyles (17)
| Rudy Gobert (16)
| Shelvin Mack (10)
| Vivint Smart Home Arena18,784
| 33–35
|-style="background:#fbb;"
| 69
| March 19
| @ Chicago
| 
| Derrick Favors (24)
| Rudy Gobert (7)
| Shelvin Mack (8)
| United Center21,856
| 33–36
|- style="background:#bfb;"
| 70
| March 20
| @ Milwaukee
| 
| Gordon Hayward (18)
| Rudy Gobert (14)
| Shelvin Mack (12)
| BMO Harris Bradley Center14,124
| 34–36
|- style="background:#bfb;"
| 71
| March 23
| @ Houston
| 
| Gordon Hayward (22)
| Derrick Favors (15)
| Gordon Hayward (5)
| Toyota Center18,151
| 35–36
|- style="background:#fbb;"
| 72
| March 24
| @ Oklahoma City
| 
| Trey Burke (17)
| Joe Ingles (7)
| Gordon Hayward (5)
| Chesapeake Energy Arena18,203
| 35–37
|- style="background:#bfb;"
| 73
| March 26
| @ Minnesota
| 
| Derrick Favors (19)
| Rudy Gobert (11)
| Shelvin Mack (6)
| Target Center14,694
| 36–37
|- style="background:#bfb;"
| 74
| March 28
| L. A. Lakers
| 
| Rodney Hood (30)
| Rudy Gobert (19)
| Gordon Hayward (6)
| Vivint Smart Home Arena19,911
| 37–37
|- style="background:#fbb;"
| 75
| March 30
| Golden State
| 
| Gordon Hayward (21)
| Rudy Gobert (18)
| Shelvin Mack (9)
| Vivint Smart Home Arena19,911
| 37–38

|- style="background:#bfb;"
| 76
| April 1
| Minnesota
| 
| Gordon Hayward (22)
| Rudy Gobert (14)
| Shelvin Mack (5)
| Vivint Smart Home Arena19,911
| 38–38
|- style="background:#bfb;"
| 77
| April 3
| @ Phoenix
| 
| Gordon Hayward (22)
| Shelvin Mack (7)
| Rodney Hood (7)
| Talking Stick Resort Arena17,279
| 39–38
|- style="background:#fbb;"
| 78
| April 5
| San Antonio
| 
| Rodney Hood (23)
| Rudy Gobert (10)
| Rodney Hood (4)
| Vivint Smart Home Arena19,381
| 39–39
|- style="background:#fbb;"
| 79
| April 8
| L. A. Clippers
| 
| Gordon Hayward (24)
| Gordon Hayward (13)
| Gordon Hayward (5)
| Vivint Smart Home Arena19,911
| 39–40
|- style="background:#bfb;"
| 80
| April 10
| @ Denver
| 
| Hayward, Lyles (22)
| Rudy Gobert (14)
| Shelvin Mack (6)
| Pepsi Center16,172
| 40–40
|- style="background:#fbb;"
| 81
| April 11
| Dallas
| 
| Gordon Hayward (24)
| Gordon Hayward (6)
| Gordon Hayward (4)
| Vivint Smart Home Arena19,911
| 40–41
|- style="background:#fbb;"
| 82
| April 13
| @ L. A. Lakers
| 
| Trey Lyles (18)
| Trey Lyles (11)
| Shelvin Mack (6)
| Staples Center18,997
| 40–42

References

2015-16
2015–16 NBA season by team
2015 in sports in Utah
2016 in sports in Utah